Saint Verus of Vienne or Verus I of Vienne ( or Vérus de Vienne, also ; ;  4th century), is a saint of the Catholic church (feast day: 1 August) and a 4th-century bishop of Vienne in France.

Life 
Verus, whose origins and earlier life are unknown, was bishop of Vienne.   Duchesne's interpretation of the traditional chronology, of which there are conflicting versions, makes Verus the fourth bishop.

He is recorded as having attended the Council of Arles in 314. 

Verus is venerated as a saint, with his feast day celebrated on 1 August, according to Ado's Martyrologie and the Bollandists.

An earlier Verus?

Chevalier, on the basis of a passage in Ado, added an earlier Verus to the traditional chronology, dating him to the reign of the Emperor Trajan:

Chevalier further mentions him as having received a letter from Pope Pius I (c. 140 – c. 154). This letter of the pope is the first document mentioned by Chevalier in the Regeste dauphinois (1912), with an date estimated as around 140/155 or 142/156. This document however forms part of the collection of "false privileges", which are considered to be probably spurious.

References

See also
Verus II of Vienne

Bishops of Vienne
Year of birth unknown
Year of death unknown
3rd-century births
4th-century deaths
Gallo-Roman saints